The Ještěd cable car is an aerial cable car service in the Czech Republic, linking Horní Hanychov in the city of Liberec with the summit of Ještěd mountain. The cable car is operated by Czech Railways.

The cable car was opened in 1933, and was operated by Czechoslovak State Railways for most of its history. In the early 1970s the cable car was reconstructed. It was reopened in its current form in 1975. On 31 October 2021, a cabin crashed in an accident and one operator was killed.

The cable car operates on a daily basis according to a pre-set timetable but does not operate in adverse weather conditions.

References

Aerial lifts in the Czech Republic
Liberec